Rasmus Seebach is the debut solo music album by Danish singer, songwriter and music producer Rasmus Seebach. The highly successful album was released on ArtPeople record label on 28 September 2009. By May 2010 it had sold over 120,000 copies and was certified Platinum album. It was the 2nd best-selling album in Denmark in 2009 to the top selling Michael Jackson album The Collection, the best-selling album of 2010, the 7th best-selling album of 2011, the 17th best-selling album of 2012, the 47th best-selling album of 2013, the 81st best-selling album of 2014 and the 60th best-selling album of 2015.
At 227 weeks, it is the all-time 2nd longest-charting album in Denmark, only behind his own Ingen kan love dig i morgen (228 weeks).

Track listing

Release history

Charts
The album was at the top of the Danish Albums Chart Tracklisten for a total of 25 weeks including 7 weeks in 2009 (weeks 43-44, 49-53) and 18 more weeks in 2010 (weeks 1-4, 7-9, 11-12, 17, 26-32, 35).
It spent 104 weeks inside the chart's top 10 and a total of 224 weeks in the top 40.

Certifications

References

2009 debut albums
Rasmus Seebach albums